The third Parkes ministry was the nineteenth ministry of the Colony of New South Wales, and was led by Sir Henry Parkes in a coalition with Sir John Robertson. It was the third of five occasions that Parkes was Leader of the Government.

Having served in the New South Wales Legislative Council between 1854 and 1856, Parkes was elected in the first free elections for the New South Wales Legislative Assembly held in 1856, however resigned from Parliament later that year. He served in the Assembly on several occasions, between 1858 and 1870, being forced to resign on at least one occasion due to his personal insolvency. He came to power as Premier on the first occasion in 1872, serving as Leader of the Government for a period of three years. However, Parkes lost the confidence of the Assembly following Governor Robinson's decision to release of the bushranger Frank Gardiner led to the defeat of the ministry in 1875.

Robertson served as Leader of the Government between 1875 and 1877, before Robertson was defeated at the 1877 election. Parkes formed his second ministry in a challenging environment where both Parkes and Robertson shared equal representation in the Legislative Assembly and business was sometimes at a standstill. Parkes' second term as Colonial Premier lasted just 147 days, with the Farnell ministry giving both Parkes and Robertson reprieve for 12 months, prior to Parkes and Robertson forming an alliance government in this ministry.

The title of Premier was widely used to refer to the Leader of Government, but not enshrined in formal use until 1920.

There was no party system in New South Wales politics until 1887. Under the constitution, ministers in the Legislative Assembly were required to resign to recontest their seats in a by-election when appointed. Such ministerial by-elections were usually uncontested and on this occasion a poll was required for Canterbury where Sir Henry Parkes was easily re-elected with more than 90% of the vote and The Lachlan where James Watson was re-elected. The 5 other ministers, James Hoskins (The Tumut), Francis Suttor (Bathurst), William Windeyer (University of Sydney), John Lackey (Central Cumberland) and Ezekiel Baker (Goldfields South), were re-elected unopposed. The 3 ministers subsequently appointed, Robert Wisdom (Morpeth), Arthur Renwick (East Sydney) and William Foster (Newtown), were also re-elected unopposed.

In 1880 the portfolio of Justice and Public Instruction was split into the portfolios of Justice and Public Instruction following the passage of the Public Instruction Act of 1880 which required a minister to assume the responsibilities of the former Council of Education.

The ministry was engulfed in a scandal in 1881. Ezekiel Baker resigned as Secretary for Mines in August 1881 following allegations concerning his conduct as a trustee of the Milburn Creek Copper Mining Co Ltd. Julian Salomons was appointed a royal commissioner to inquire into inquire into the expenditure and distribution of £17,100, paid by the Government, under the authority of a Parliamentary vote, to the company. Salomons reported that "there was an appropriation by the trustees to themselves ... but under circumstances of concealment and false statement" and that there was an inference that one of the trustees, George Waddell, had bribed a member of the Legislative Assembly, Thomas Garrett, to vote in favour of the payment. Following publication of the report, on 8 November Parkes moved that Baker was guilty "of conduct unworthy of a member of this House, and seriously reflecting upon the honour and dignity of Parliament", a motion that was carried by 71 votes to 2 and the assembly then voted to expel Baker. Two days later Parkes moved a similar motion in relation to Garrett, however the motion was defeated by 40 votes to 38. This was the end of the coalition between Parkes and Robertson, with Robertson resigning from the ministry because he could not consent to being one of the accusers of Mr Baker and Mr Garrett, and their cases should have been decided in a court of law.

This ministry covers the period from 21 December 1878 until 4 January 1883.

Composition of ministry

Ministers are members of the Legislative Assembly unless otherwise noted.

See also

References

 

New South Wales ministries
1878 establishments in Australia
1883 disestablishments in Australia